Félix Braz (born 16 March 1966) is a Luxembourgish politician who served as Second Deputy Prime Minister of Luxembourg from 2018 to 2019. A member of the Greens, Braz also served as Minister of Justice in the Bettel-Schneider coalition government. In October 2019, he was removed as Second Deputy Prime Minister and Minister of Justice because of health issues.

Biography 
Braz, son of Portuguese  immigrants, was born in Differdange in 1966. After secondary school, he started studying law at Panthéon-Sorbonne University, but broke off his studies after one year.

In 1990 he worked as chief editor and presenter of a news broadcast in Portuguese on RTL Radio Lëtzebuerg.

From 1991 he was the parliamentary secretary for the Greens. He was also a communal councillor in Esch-sur-Alzette from 1995 to 2000, and an alderman (échevin) from 2000 to 2011. 

He was first elected to the Chamber of Deputies in 2004 for the Sud constituency, and was re-elected in 2009 and 2013. In the Chamber, he was vice-chairman of the Committee for Transport from 2004 to 2009. After the October 2013 elections, he became chairman of the Greens' parliamentary group. He joined the new coalition government as Minister for Justice on 4 December 2013.

References

External links
 

Living people
1966 births
Deputy Prime Ministers of Luxembourg
The Greens (Luxembourg) politicians
Members of the Chamber of Deputies (Luxembourg) from Sud
Ministers for Justice of Luxembourg
People from Differdange
Luxembourgian people of Portuguese descent